Jon Fisher (born January 19, 1972) is a Silicon Valley entrepreneur and writer.

Jon sold his own NFTs before starting software company ViciNFT. He is the CEO and a co-founder of medical technology company, CrowdOptic. As co-inventor and co-founding CEO, Fisher built three companies including Bharosa—which produced the Oracle Adaptive Access Manager and sold to Oracle Corporation for a reported $50 million in 2007, NetClerk—now part of Roper Technologies and AutoReach—now part of AutoNation.

Early life and education
Fisher was born in Stanford, California to university professors Gerald and Anita Fisher. His father is a nuclear physicist at Stanford. Fisher graduated from The Nueva School and Crystal Springs Uplands School, and attended Vassar College before graduating from the University of San Francisco.

Career

In 1994, Fisher cofounded and was chief executive officer of AutoReach, now an AutoNation company. Former Oracle President and recent Hewlett Packard chairman Ray Lane was Fisher's first angel investor and also invested in two of Fisher's later start ups. In 1998, Fisher was the co-founder and CEO of the business software company, NetClerk, Inc., now part of Roper Technologies. The company created the online construction permit. In 2004, Fisher cofounded and was chief executive officer of Bharosa, which was acquired by Oracle Corporation in 2007.

CrowdOptic
Fisher co-founded CrowdOptic in 2011 with Jeff Broderick, Doug Van Blaricom and Alex Malinovsky. In April 2011, Fisher became the CEO of CrowdOptic. The company offers augmented reality technology for use in incident response, medicine and sports. Fisher marketed CrowdOptic in professional sports. Wired magazine's Bruce Sterling wrote about CrowdOptic "I've never read a work of fiction or nonfiction that ever implied that such a technology might be possible. In 2016 Julie Bort wrote for Business Insider that CrowdOptic's technology was "so cool, we've never seen anything like it." In 2017 a Silicon Review cover story featured Fisher and CrowdOptic's partnership with Hewlett Packard Enterprise.

Academic career
Fisher is an adjunct professor at the University of San Francisco. Fisher has written a book, Strategic Entrepreneurism: Shattering the Start-Up Entrepreneurial Myths, which was published in 2008 by SelectBooks. 

Fisher's 2018 commencement speech at the University of San Francisco was viewed more than ten million times. Drawing on this, his second book, I Took the Only Path to See You, was published in 2021 by Wiley Publishers. The publisher also issued a non-fungible token (NFT) to promote the book.

Honors
 American City Business Journals Forty Under 40 (2006)
 Ernst & Young Entrepreneur Of The Year, Emerging Category (2007)

Patents
Named on over 100 patents globally, Fisher was a co-patentee in a contextual authentication patent awarded to Bharosa, which later received five issued patents and has twelve patents pending. Fisher was also a co-patentee in the technology behind Glass at Work partner CrowdOptic, which triangulates two or more electronic devices focused in the same direction at the same time.

Prediction of 2010 US unemployment peak
Fisher has made predictions about the U.S. economy, particularly unemployment rates. Fisher has commented that the drop in housing starts is a good indicator of the direction the unemployment rate is headed. He writes: "Historically, when new U.S. housing starts have plunged, unemployment has surged in the following year", concluding that he believes a linear correlation exists between national housing starts and national unemployment in times of severe recession. In April 2008 at Marquette University, he predicted U.S. unemployment would rise to 9% by April 2009.

On Nov. 8, 2008, Fisher stated on National Public Radio that higher unemployment wouldn't increase foreclosures because there weren't many homeowners left who couldn't pay their mortgages, even without a job—although he thought they might not buy as many vehicles and other large purchases.

In August 2009 at the Commonwealth Club of California, Fisher predicted U.S. unemployment would peak at not more than 10.4% before declining to 8.0% by end of 2010. Fisher stated the consumer's home may be the center of the U.S. and international economies, challenging The World Is Flat thesis by Thomas L. Friedman. Fisher has been an outspoken critic of the Treasury's bailout plans, saying "there are various techniques of restructuring that are familiar in the business world, none of which are being used by the government." However, Fisher wrote that "entrepreneurship should not be used to bludgeon the safety net."

Personal life and philanthropy
Fisher married Darla Kincheloe Fisher, owner of Koze clothing boutiques, in 2002, and their daughter was born in 2010. Jon's daughter become the youngest scuba magician at age 12. 

Fisher has been a trustee of the Nueva School in Hillsborough, CA and was a member of their 2008 capital campaign team. He has also been a trustee of the Pacific Vascular Research Foundation in South San Francisco, and he has been on the board of the Buck Institute For Age Research. Fisher was a major fundraiser for the Joe Biden 2020 presidential campaign.

See also
 CrowdOptic
 Entrepreneurship
 Oracle Corporation

References

External links
 Jon Fisher keynotes University of San Francisco commencement 2018

1972 births
Living people
People from Stanford, California
21st-century American inventors
University of San Francisco alumni
Vassar College alumni
American technology chief executives
American technology company founders
Silicon Valley people
Nueva School alumni
American Internet company founders
American business writers
American patent holders